Umar Lee (born Brett Darren Lee; September 18, 1974 in St. Louis, Missouri) is an American writer, media personality and political activist.

Religion
Coming from a white Protestant background, Lee converted to Sunni Islam in the 1990s, and quickly associated himself within the Salafi movement. In 2007, Lee authored a ten post blog series entitled The Rise and Fall of the Salafi Movement, which focused mostly on black converts to Salafism in the United States, in a lineage of interest in Islam which he traced from Malcolm X onward. Lee's writing about the movement portrayed his disillusionment with various aspects of the Salafi movement such as a separation from the real world, divisions, and overseas influence. During this time, Lee's blog won the award for "best series" in the Brass Crescent Awards. In 2017, Lee criticized the Georgetown Islamic Studies Professor Jonathan Brown after he attended his lecture on slavery.

Political activity
Lee, while working as a cab driver, campaigned against the introduction of ride-share companies to the St. Louis Market. In 2014, Lee covered the Ferguson unrest and was interviewed on several national outlets. During his coverage of the events, Lee was arrested on two occasions  Lee was subsequently fired as a cab driver and contended that it was for his political activities in Ferguson. In 2016 Lee briefly announced he was running for St. Louis Mayor as a Republican. Lee also writes Noir Literature that is based in St. Louis.

Since June 2018, Lee hosted St. Louis Speaks, a podcast that fosters dialog about St. Louis and the surrounding area.  The podcast was co-created and is produced by historian Mark Loehrer In 2020, the podcast changed its name to Informal History STL and added several local historians and writers while adding a quarterly print publication.  In 2021, he began hosting a podcast with Father Augustine Wetta entitled "Disagreement."

Personal life
Umar Lee was born to James D. Lee and Karen Arnold, in St Louis, Missouri into a blue collar family.  Lee's 19-year old nephew, an aspiring SoundCloud rapper named Shelbyon Polk (also known as "Lil' Chubb"), was found dead with gunshot wounds to his torso on Thanksgiving Day 2017 in St Louis. Lee's mother, Karen Arnold, was murdered on December 18, 2018 in Kirkwood, Missouri by unknown assailants who broke into her apartment while she was sleeping and shot her.

References

Footnotes

Bibliography

External links
 The Rise and Fall of the Salafi Dawah in America: a memoir by Umar Lee

1974 births
Living people
American male writers
American political activists
Writers from St. Louis
Converts to Islam from Protestantism
American Salafis